Italy, up until the Italian unification in 1861, was a conglomeration of city-states, republics, and other independent entities. The following is a list of the various Italian states during that period. Following the fall of the Western Roman Empire and the arrival of the Middle Ages (in particular from the 11th century), the Italian peninsula was divided into numerous states. Many of these states consolidated into major political units that balanced the power on the Italian peninsula: the Papal States, the Venetian Republic, the Republic of Florence, the Duchy of Milan, the Kingdom of Naples and the Kingdom of Sicily. Unlike all the other Italian states, the republics of Venice and Genoa, thanks to their maritime powers, went beyond territorial conquests within the Italian peninsula, conquering various regions across the Mediterranean and Black Seas.

Archaic Italy

 Italic peoples:
Latino-Faliscans:
 Latins (Roman Kingdom)
 Romans 
 Falisci
 Osco-Umbrians, also called Sabellians:
 Umbrians
 Marsi
 Umbri
 Volsci
 Oscans
 Marrucini
 Osci
 Aurunci
 Ausones
 Campanians
 Paeligni
 Sabines
 Samnitics
 Bruttii
 Frentani
 Lucani
 Samnites
 Pentri
 Caraceni
 Caudini
 Hirpini
 Others
Aequi
 Fidenates
 Hernici
 Picentes
 Vestini
 Sicels
 Venetics
 Ligures
Greek-speaking peoples of Southern Italy
Etruscans
Sardinians

Classical Italy

 Roman Kingdom
 Roman Republic
 Roman Empire

Early Middle Ages
 Kingdom of Italy 
 Ostrogothic Kingdom
 Lombard Kingdom
 Duchy of Rome (under the Byzantine Empire)
 Exarchate of Ravenna (under the Byzantine Empire)
 Exarchate of Carthage (under the Byzantine Empire)
 Thema of Sicily (under the Byzantine Empire)
 Duchy of Benevento
 Duchy of Spoleto
 Papal States
 Republic of Venice
Duchy of Naples
 Kingdom of Italy (under the Carolingian Empire)
 Catepanate of Italy (under the Byzantine Empire)

High Middle Ages

States in Central and Northern Italy 
 Papal States
 Republic of Venice
 Republic of Genoa
 Republic of Pisa
 Republic of Florence
 Republic of Lucca
 Republic of Siena
 Republic of Ancona
 Republic of Noli
 Republic of Senarica
 Republic of Ragusa
 Republic of San Marino

States in Southern Italy 
 Principality of Benevento
 Principality of Salerno
 Catepanate of Italy (under the Byzantine Empire)
 Principality of Capua
 Duchy of Gaeta
 Duchy of Naples
 Duchy of Amalfi
 Duchy of Sorrento
 Emirate of Sicily (under the Fatimid Caliphate)
 County of Sicily
 County of Apulia
 Duchy of Apulia
 Duchy of Calabria
 Duchy of Apulia and Calabria
 Kingdom of Sicily

States of the Holy Roman Empire
 Kingdom of Italy (also called Kingdom of Lombardy)
Commune of Milan
 March of Tuscany
 March of Verona
 March of Treviso
 March of Ivrea
 March of Turin
 March of Montferrat
 March of Genoa
 Patriarchate of Aquileia (including March of Friuli and March of Istria)
 Duchy of Spoleto
 Bishopric of Brixen
 Bishopric of Trent
 County of Savoy
 County of Gorizia
 Marquisate of Saluzzo
 Marquisate of Ceva
 Marquisate of Incisa
 Marquisate of Finale

Sardinian Judicates
 Agugliastra
 Arborea
 Cagliari
 Gallura
 Logudoro

Late Middle Ages

Major States 
 Papal States
 Republic of Venice
 Republic of Florence
 Kingdom of Naples
 Duchy of Milan
 Republic of Genoa

Minor States 
 Kingdom of Sicily
 Kingdom of Sardinia and Corsica
 Duchy of Ferrara
 Duchy of Modena and Reggio
 Prince-Bishopric of Brixen
 Prince-Bishopric of Trent
 Marquisate of Saluzzo
 Marquisate of Montferrat
 Rebel city-states in Papal States
 Marquisate of Mantua
 Marquisate of Massa
 Marquisate of Finale
 Marquisate of Incisa
 Marquisate of Ceva
 Marquisate of Fosdinovo
 Marquisate of Bastia
 County of Savoy (raised to Duchy of Savoy in 1416)
 County of Urbino (raised to Duchy of Urbino in 1443)
 County of Mirandola
 Golden Ambrosian Republic
 County of Guastalla
 County of Nice (in personal union with Savoy)
 County of Gorizia
 County of Montechiarugolo
 County of Santa Fiora
 County of Asti
 County of Masserano
 County of Correggio
 County of Pitigliano
 County of Novellara
 County of Tende
 County of Sovana
 County of Scandiano
 Republic of Lucca
 Republic of Siena
 Republic of Ancona
 Republic of Noli
 Republic of Senarica
 Republic of Cospaia
 Republic of Ragusa
 Republic of San Marino

After the Italian Wars

The Peace of Cateau Cambrésis ended the Italian Wars in 1559. The kingdoms of Sicily, Sardinia, Naples (inclusive of the State of Presidi) and the Duchy of Milan were left under the control of Spanish Habsburgs. France was in control of several fortresses and in particular of the Marquisate of Saluzzo. All the other Italian states remained independent, with the most powerful being the Venetian Republic, the Medici's Duchy of Tuscany, the Savoyard state, the Republic of Genoa, and the Papal States. The Gonzaga in Mantua, the Este in Modena and Ferrara and the Farnese in Parma and Piacenza continued to be important dynasties. Parts of the north of Italy remained a part of the Holy Roman Empire.

Major States 
 Papal States
 Republic of Venice
 Grand Duchy of Tuscany
 Kingdom of Naples 
 Republic of Genoa
 Duchy of Savoy
 Duchy of Milan

Minor States 
 Kingdom of Sicily
 Duchy of Mantua
 Duchy of Parma and Piacenza
 Duchy of Ferrara
 Kingdom of Sardinia (under Spanish rule)
 Duchy of Modena and Reggio (In personal union with Ferrara)
 Duchy of Urbino
 Duchy of Castro (in personal union with Parma)
 Prince-Bishopric of Brixen
 Prince-Bishopric of Trent
 Principality of Piombino
 Principality of Monaco
 Marquisate of Montferrat (raised to Duchy of Montferrat in 1574; in personal union with Mantua)
 Marquisate of Masserano (raised to Principality of Masserano in 1598)
 Marquisate of Sabbioneta (raised to Duchy of Sabbioneta in 1577)
 Marquisate of Finale
 Marquisate of Massa (raised to Principality of Massa in 1568)
 Marquisate of Carrara (in personal union with Massa)
 Marquisate of Castiglione (raised to Principality of Castiglione in 1609)
 Marquisate of Torriglia
 Marquisate of Fosdinovo
 Marquisate of Bastia
 County of Guastalla
 County of Mirandola
 County of Montechiarugolo
 County of Correggio (raised to Principality of Correggio in 1616)
 County of Novellara
 County of Pitigliano
 County of Tende
 County of Santa Fiora
 Republic of Ancona
 Republic of Lucca
 Republic of Ragusa
 Republic of San Marino
 Republic of Noli
 Republic of Senarica
 Republic of Cospaia
 Hospitaller Malta

After the Wars of Succession of the 18th century

Following the European wars of succession of the 18th century and the extinction of the House of Medici, the Grand Duchy of Tuscany was ruled by the Habsburg-Lorraine. Some minor states in Central and Northern Italy, such as Parma and Mantua, passed to the Austrian monarchy. Southern Italy passed to a cadet branch of the House of Bourbon, known as House of Bourbon-Two Sicilies. While other states such as Genoa, Savoy, Modena and Lucca remained with their governments unchanged.

Major States 
 Papal States
 Republic of Venice
 Kingdom of Naples (under the Austrian monarchy from 1714 to 1734; in personal union with Sicily under the Bourbon-Two Sicilies thereafter)
 Grand Duchy of Tuscany (under Habsburg-Lorraine after 1737)
 Duchy of Savoy
 Republic of Genoa
 Duchy of Milan (under Habsburg Monarchy)

Minor states 
 Kingdom of Sardinia (under Austrian monarchy from 1714 to 1720; in personal union with Savoy thereafter)
 Kingdom of Sicily (under Savoy from 1714 to 1720; under Austrian monarchy from 1720 to 1734; in personal union with Naples under the Bourbon-Two Sicilies thereafter)
 Duchy of Mantua (under Austrian Monarchy)
 Duchy of Parma and Piacenza (under Habsburg Monarchy from 1734 to 1748)
 Duchy of Guastalla (in personal union with Parma from 1748)
 Duchy of Modena and Reggio

 Duchy of Massa and Carrara (in personal union with Modena from 1731)
 Duchy of Mirandola (in personal union with Modena from 1710)
 Prince-Bishopric of Brixen
 Prince-Bishopric of Trent
 Principality of Masserano
 Principality of Torriglia
 Principality of Piombino
 Principality of Monaco
 Duchy of Montferrat
 Marquisate of Fosdinovo
 Marquisate of Bastia
 Republic of Lucca
 Republic of San Marino
 Republic of Ragusa
 Republic of Noli
 Republic of Senarica
 Republic of Cospaia
 City of Fiume and its District

Their populations and other vital statistics stood as follows in the late 18th century:

 Kingdom of Naples (including Sicily): 6,000,000 (400,000 in Naples), army of 60,000 to 80,0000, 2 ships of the lines and some frigates
 Republic of Venice: 3,500,000 (140,000 in the city of Venice itself), standing army and navy of 30,000, 12-15 ships of at least 54 guns plus frigates and brigs
 Kingdom of Sardinia: 2,900,000 (2,400,000 on the mainland and 500,000 on the island), 12-15 fortified cities and towns (largest being Turin at 80,000), standing army of 25,000, which could be raised to 50,000 in a time of war and 100,000 with militia
 The Papal States: 2,400,000 (140,000 in the city of Rome), standing army of 6,000 to 7,000
 Austrian Lombardy (Duchy of Milan, Duchy of Mantua, and minor territories): 1,100,000 (40,000 in the city of Milan itself)
 Grand Duchy of Tuscany: 1,000,000 (80,000 in Florence), standing army of 6,000, navy of 3 frigates
 Republic of Genoa: 500,000 (100,000 in the city of Genoa itself)
 Duchy of Parma: 500,000 (40,000 in the city of Parma itself), standing army of 2,500 to 3,000
 Duchy of Modena: 350,000 (20,000 in the city of Modena itself), standing army of 5,000 to 6,000
 Republic of Lucca: 100,000
Total: 18.3 million

During Napoleonic times (1792–1815)

Sister republics of Revolutionary France
 Republic of Alba
 Anconine Republic
 Astese Republic
 Republic of Bergamo
 Bolognese Republic
 Republic of Brescia
 Cisalpine Republic
 Cispadane Republic
 Republic of Crema
 Italian Republic
 Ligurian Republic
 Jacobin State of Lucca
 Parthenopean Republic
 Republic of Pescara
 Piedmontese Republic
 Roman Republic
 Subalpine Republic
 Tiberina Republic
 Transpadane Republic

In personal union with France
 Kingdom of Italy

Client states of the First French Empire
 Kingdom of Etruria
 Kingdom of Naples
 Principality of Lucca and Piombino
 
 Principality of Pontecorvo

Other states
 Kingdom of Sardinia
 Kingdom of Sicily
 Principality of Elba (non-hereditary Monarchy under the exiled Emperor Napoleon)
 Republic of San Marino
 Republic of Cospaia

From the Restoration to the Unification

Following the defeat of Napoleon's France, the Congress of Vienna (1815) was convened to redraw the European continent. In Italy, the Congress restored the pre-Napoleonic patchwork of independent governments, either directly ruled or strongly influenced by the prevailing European powers, particularly Austria. The Congress also determined the end of two millenary republics: Genoa was annexed by the then Savoyard Kingdom of Sardinia, and Venice was incorporated with Milan into a new kingdom of the Austrian Empire.

At the time, the struggle for Italian unification was perceived to be waged primarily against the Habsburgs, since they directly controlled the predominantly Italian-speaking northeastern part of present-day Italy and were the most powerful force against the Italian unification. The Austrian Empire vigorously repressed nationalist sentiment growing in its domains on the Italian peninsula, as well as in the other parts of Habsburg domains.

 Papal States
 Kingdom of Sardinia
 Kingdom of the Two Sicilies
 Kingdom of Lombardy–Venetia (under Austrian Empire)
 Kingdom of Illyria (under Austrian Empire)
 Grand Duchy of Tuscany
 Duchy of Parma, Piacenza and Guastalla
 Duchy of Modena and Reggio
 Duchy of Massa and Carrara
 Duchy of Lucca
 Principality of Monaco
 Republic of San Marino
 Republic of Cospaia
 Republic of San Marco
 Roman Republic
 United Provinces of Central Italy

Post-unification

 Kingdom of Italy
 Italian Regency of Carnaro
 Free State of Fiume
 Italian Social Republic
 Free Territory of Trieste
Micronation
 Kingdom of Tavolara
 Republic of Rose Island

Italian Partisan Republics
The Italian Partisan Republics were the provisional state entities liberated by Italian partisans from the rule and occupation of Nazi Germany and the Italian Social Republic in 1944 during the Second World War. They were universally short-lived, with most of them being reconquered by the Wehrmacht within weeks of their formal establishments and re-incorporated into the Italian Social Republic.

 Republic of Alba (10 October - 2 November)
 Republic of Alto Monferrato (September - 2 December)
 Republic of Alto Tortonese (September - December)
 Republic of Bobbio (7 July - 27 August)
 Republic of the Cansiglio (July - September)
  (26 September - 10 October)
  (2 February - March 1944)
 Republic of Oriental Friuli (30 June - September)
 Republic of Pigna (IM) (18 September 1944 - 8 October 1944)
 Republic of the Langhe (September - November)
 (17 June - 1º August)
 Republic of Ossola (10 September - 23 October)
  (26 June - 27 November)
 Republic of the Ceno Valley (10 June - 11 July)
 Republic of the Enza Valley and the Parma Valley (June - July)
 Republic of the Maira Valley and the Varaita Valley (June - 21 August)
  (15 June - 24 July)
 Republic of the Lanzo Valley (25 June - September)
 Republic of the Sesia Valley (11 June - 10 July)
 Republic of Varzi (19/24 September - 29 November)

See also
 Italian city-states
 Maritime republics
 Medieval commune
 Signoria

References

States

Italy
Historic states
Italy